Philéas Lebesgue (26 November 1869 in La Neuville-Vault, Picardy, France - 11 October 1958 in the same village) was a French essayist and translator. At once a poet, novelist, essayist, translator and literary critic.

Introduction
Philéas Lebesgue, French writer, editor of the Mercure de France, was born and died in La Neuville-vault where his parents were farmers. He succeeded after their demise.  He then leads the head being a farmer in his village and a  literary career which will include travel to Portugal, Greece and Yugoslavia, the three countries which he held the literary chronicle the Mercure de France.

After the Latin, English and Greek, studied in college, he learned other languages and wrote his first poems. In 1896 he became editor of the Mercure de France, an  international journal  He was the chronicler of "Portuguese Letters" and will remain so until 1951.  It is one of the few critics to discover and enjoy the great Portuguese poet Pessoa, in 1913. 
Phileas Lebesgue included at least 16 foreign languages. These are German, English, Danish, Spanish, Galician, Welsh, Greek, Italian, Norwegian, Polish, Portuguese, Romanian, Russian, Serbo-Croatian Slovenian and Czech. Must be added the Sanskrit, Old French, and three regional languages in France: Breton, Provençal and Picard spoke to his village.  He has worked on magazines in foreign languages, including L'Arte (Coimbra, 1895-1896), Atlantida (Lisbon, 1917), O Mundo (Lisbon, 1915), The Panathenaic (Athens, 1910), Periodikon nios (Piraeus, 1900), The Vos (Madrid, 1923).

From 1926, Phileas Lebesgue chairs the Academy of the ten provinces and the League of provincial writers, with which it attempts to consolidate regional writers, foreign and colonial French.

Poet symbolist in its infancy, Phileas Lebesgue written in verse as well as traditional free verse. He wrote a poem in free verse or traditional, often evoking the landscapes of his country of Bray.

He is a novelist, songwriter, playwright, literary critic, columnist, translator, and mayor of La Neuville-Vault from 1908 to 1947.  In his works, he was inspired by nature, history, rural life, his travels and esotericism.

Philéas Lebesgue and esotericism
The esotericism of Phileas Lebesgue is only poetic as that of his friend Oscar Milosz .  In 1911, he joined the French Celtic League, created by the poet Robert Pelletier, to refute the "lies" of the Latin character of France. He agrees to be the « Grand Druide des Gaules »,  the spiritual authority of the Collège bardique des Gaules founded in 1933 by poet and publisher of music, Jacques Heugel, association that terminates in 1939.

He was already in Breton bard who received the second prize of L'Hermine in 1892.

Société des Amis de Philéas Lebesgue (The association of Friends of Philéas Lebesgue)
It was founded in 1930, Philéas Lebesgue's lifetime, by Camille Belliard and Marius Alphonse Gossez, teachers.  The purpose of association is then to make known the life and work of the writer.

Bibliography
37 collections of poetry from 12 to 205 pages, 18 novels, stories and dramas, essays or works of 13 Philology and History, 21 translations (alone or in collaboration, mainly with Manoel gahisto, alias Paul Coolen), including 3 Old French, from Breton 2, 3 Spanish, 3 of the Greek Revival, 7 and 3 of the Portuguese Serbo-Croatian.

Major collections of poems
 Le Buisson ardent, Seiches-sur-le-Loir, Ed. Henry Cormeau, 1910, réédité en 1988, 161 p.
 Les Servitudes, Paris, Ed. du Mercure de France, 1913, 169 p.
 La Grande pitié, Paris, Ed. Edward Sansot, 1920, 116 p.
 La Bûche dans l'âtre, Paris, Ed. Chiberre, 1923, 143 p.
 Les Chansons de Margot, Amiens, Ed. Edgar Malfère, 1926, réédité en 1991, 205 p.
 Présages, Paris, Ed. André Delpeuch, 1928, 104 p. (Prix Jean Moréas en 1929).
 Triptolème ébloui, Paris, Ed; de la Revue des Poètes, Lib. acad. Perrin, 1930, 171 p.
 Arc-en-ciel, poèmes in mémoriam, La Chapelle-aux-Pots, calligraphe R. Biet, 1938, 88 p.
 Sur les pas du soleil, Paris, Ed. Jean-Renard, 1944, 93 p.
 Une anthologie regroupant 800 poèmes sur 1600, choisis par André Matrat, a été publiée sous le titre Œuvres poétiques en 3 volumes de 450 p. chacun. Méru, Ed. du Thelle, 1950-1952.

Mains romans and nouvelles
 Le Sang de l'autre, Paris, Sté d'éd. littéraires, 1901, réédité en 1949, en 1967, et en 2010 par les éditions le Trotteur ailé, 313 p.
 Destin, journal d'une femme, 1ère édition sous le titre Les Feuilles de rose- Journal d'une femme en 1903, Paris, Ed. Charles, rééditions en 1904, 1934, 1990, 220 p.
 La Nuit rouge, Paris, Ed. Sansot, 1905, 2e édition traduite en espagnol par César A. Comet: La Noche roja, Madrid, Editorial-America, 1925, réédité en français en 1946 et 1987.
 Outre-Terre, aventures dans l'invisible, Paris, Ed. de la Phalange, 80 p., 2e édition en espagnol par César A. Comet, publiée avec La Noche roja en 1925.
 Kalochori, roman crétois, Paris, Ed. Eugène Figuières, 1928, réédité en 1969, 252 p.
 Terre picarde, trois nouvelles, Grandvilliers, Ed. du Bonhomme picard, 1950. 2e édition: Cuise-la-Motte, Ed. du trotteur ailé, 2008, 95 p.

Some tragedies and dramas
 La Tragédie du Grand Ferré, trilogie dramatique en vers, Paris, Ed. des Libraires associés, 1892, 204 p.
 Thomas Becket, tragédie en vers, 1942, inédit
 Philippe de Dreux, tragédie en vers, 1943, inédit
 Le Rachat de Prométhée, poème dramatique, Vieux-Condé (Nord), Ed. Le Sol clair, 1947, 32 p.

Main tests
 Les Lois de la parole, essai de synthèse phonétique, Beauvais, Imp. du Moniteur de l'Oise,  16 p., 1899
 L'Au-delà des grammaires, essai de prosodie générale, Paris, Ed. Sansot, 314 p.,1904
 Aux fenêtres de France, "Essai sur la formation du goût français", Paris, Ed. Sansot, 1906, 93 p., réédité en 1934.
 La Grèce littéraire d'aujourd'hui,  Ed Sansot, Paris,  84 p., 1906
 Le Pèlerinage à Babel, voyage d'un indigène de Counani à la recherche de la langue parfaite,  Ed. Sansot, Paris, 167 p., 1912
 La République portugaise "Le sentiment national - Les ouvriers de l'ère moderne - La République vivante",  Ed. Sansot, Paris, 387 p.,  1914
 La Pensée de Rabindranath Tagore, Bruxelles, Ed. de La Nervie, 1927, 35 p., réédité en 2003 dans le Bulletin des Amis de Philéas Lebesgue n°37.
 L'Héritage intellectuel de Virgile au Portugal et en France,  Ed. Institut français au Portugal, Coïmbre, 30 p., 1932
 La Musique primitive dans ses rapports avec la poésie lyrique, article dans la revue L'Âge nouveau, oct. 1938.

Published articles in journals and newspapers
Contributions in over 200 publications, the main one being the Mercure de France

 Phileas Lebesgue wrote some 500 articles in the Mercure de France, from 1896 to 1951 =  "The Portuguese Letters", and temporarily "Letters from Norwegian", "The New Greek Letters" and "Letters of Yugoslavia".
 Editorials in La République de l'Oise (The Republic of the Oise): 330, May 1910-May 1941 and 93 in the Oise released from September 1944 to July 1950.

Some translations with critical comments
 Le Songe d'enfer suivi de La Voie de Paradis de Raoul de Houdenc, Poème du XIIIe siècle, traduction et commentaire critique,  Ed. Sansot, Paris, 235 p., 1908
 Les Perses de l'Occident de Sotíris Skípis, drame en 3 actes, traduit du néo-grec par l'auteur et Philéas Lebesgue, préface de Paul Fort,  Ed. Eugène Figuière, Paris, 1917
 Le Roman d'Amadis de Gaule. Reconstitution du roman portugais du XIIIe siècle par Affonso Lopes-Vieira, traduit en français par Philéas Lebesgue.  Ed. Claude Aveline, Paris, 222 p., 1924

in Picard language
 Ein acoutant l'cloque de l'Toussaint, Rédriyes picardes,  Imp. de l'Hebdomadaire picard,  Grandvilliers, 46 p., 1939,
 Poèmes et contes brayons, contes dispersés dans des revues de 1892 à 1949 ou inédits, rassemblés, commentés avec traduction par , publication posthume, Beauvais, Centre départemental de documentation pédagogique, coll. Éklitra,  85 p., 1986
 Grammaire picard-brayonne, présentée par René Debrie et François Beauvy, publication posthume,  Centre d'études picardes, Université de Picardie, Amiens,  63 p., 1984

Studies devoted to Philéas Lebesgue

 Gahisto (P.-M.), Au cœur des provinces - Philéas Lebesgue, Roubaix, Ed. du Beffroi, 1908, 80 p.
 Gossez (A.-M.), Les Célébrités d'aujourd'hui - Philéas Lebesgue, Paris, Ed. Sansot, 1924, 32 p.
 Striegler (Helmut), "Inaugural-Dissertation" : Philéas Lebesgue, ein Dichter der Pikardie, Université de Leipzig, 1934 (Étude publiée en 1935 en Allemagne).
 Roger Berrou, Philéas Lebesgue le Paysan de l'Univers, dans le tome 1 des Œuvres poétiques, 1950, 131 p., réédité par la Société des Amis de Philéas Lebesgue, 1996.
 , Philéas Lebesgue, poète de Picardie, coll. Éklitra,  imp. Sinet, Grandvilliers,   43 p., 1967
 Gisèle Le Crocq, Philéas Lebesgue et la Grèce, mémoire de Diplôme, Faculté des lettres et sciences humaines d'Aix-en-Provence, 1967-1968, 163 p. - Réédité dans le Bulletin des Amis de Philéas Lebesgue (n° 38 de 2004 au n° 42 de 2008).
 André Camus, Jean Dubillet et Pierre Garnier, Le centenaire de Philéas Lebesgue, Eklitra, Amiens, 1969, 35 p.
 François Beauvy, Le Paysage dans l'œuvre poétique de Philéas Lebesgue, mémoire de DEA, Université de Picardie -Jules Verne, 1994, publié en 1995 par la Société des Amis de Philéas Lebesgue, 150 pages.
 Anton Figueroa, Lecturas alleas - Sobre das relacions con outras literaturas, Santiago de Compostele, Ed. Gotelo blanco, 1996, 155 p. (Publié en Espagne, traite de la correspondance de Philéas Lebesgue avec les écrivains de langue galicienne).
 Claudio Veiga, Um Brasilianista francês - Philéas Lebesgue, Rio de Janeiro, Ed. Topbooks, 1998, 185 p. (Publié au Brésil).
 François Beauvy, rubrique sur Philéas Lebesgue, dans le Dictionnaire de biographie française, Paris, Ed. Letouzey et Ané, tome XX, fascicule 115, 2003.
 François Beauvy, Philéas Lebesgue et ses correspondants en France et dans le monde, thèse de doctorat, Université de Paris X - Nanterre, 2003, publiée en 2004, Beauvais, Ed. Awen, 674 p. et 16 p. hors-texte de Philéas Lebesgue et ses confrères.

Notes and references

External links
 
 Philéas Lebesgue (Association généalogique de l'Oise)
 Présentation de Philéas Lebesgue par Jean-Pierre Crespin
 Présentation de Philéas Lebesgue sur le site Atlantis
 Poèmes  et autre poème de Philéas Lebesgue
 Table des matières de Philéas Lebesgue et ses correspondants en France et dans le monde de François Beauvy
 Bulletin des amis de Philéas Lebesgue
 Présentation de Philéas Lebesgue par sa petite-fille Thérèse Lefebvre et l'écrivain François Beauvy à La Neuville-Vault.

French poets
Picardy
Oïl languages
1869 births
1958 deaths
19th-century French dramatists and playwrights
20th-century French dramatists and playwrights
French journalists
20th-century French novelists
Esotericists
Officiers of the Légion d'honneur
Translators from Portuguese
20th-century French translators
French male essayists
French male poets
French male novelists
French male dramatists and playwrights
19th-century French essayists
20th-century French essayists
19th-century French male writers
20th-century French male writers
19th-century French translators